James Edward Ludovic Graham (born 26 May 1961, Scarborough), is a British television producer and director.

Career
Graham produced the four-part documentary series The Choir for BBC2, which won a BAFTA Award for best feature at the British Academy Television Awards 2007. His first major work was as director of the three-part TV series Strictly Supernatural, narrated by Christopher Lee and with consulting astrologer Robert Currey, for the Discovery Channel and DVD release in 1997. Graham went on to produce series such as Paddington Green for BBC1 in 1998 a historical reality TV series That'll Teach 'Em for Channel 4 and Road to Berlin featuring the journey of pub landlord Al Murray through the last stages of World War II for the Discovery Channel.

Personal life
Graham has been married to TV presenter Kate Humble since 1992.  In 2007, they moved to Monmouthshire and live on a working farm in the Wye Valley.

Filmography
 Museum of Life (2010) TV series documentary  -  executive producer
 Montezuma (2009) TV documentary -  executive producer
 Rivers with Griff Rhys Jones (2009) BBC TV series documentary -  executive producer
 Being ... Neil Armstrong (2009) TV documentary - executive producer
 Top Dogs: Adventures in War, Sea and Ice (2009) - executive producer
 Trouble in Amish Paradise (2009) TV documentary - executive producer
 Apollo Wives (2009) TV documentary - executive producer
 Crime and Punishment (2008) TV series - director & producer
 The Choir (2006) TV series documentary - series producer & director
 Road to Berlin (2004) TV mini-series documentary - series producer
 Time Commanders (2003) TV series documentary - series producer
 Castle (2003) TV mini-series documentary - director& producer
 Alaskan Wilds (2003) TV mini-series documentary - producer
 Paddington Green (1998) BBC TV series - producer
 Strictly Supernatural  (1997) Discovery TV series  - director
 The Hit Man & Her (1992) ITV late-night music series - producer & director

See also
 The Monty

References

External links
 Official site
 
 Ludo Graham's band, The Monty

1961 births
Living people
BAFTA winners (people)
British television producers
Place of birth missing (living people)
People from Monmouthshire
People from Scarborough, North Yorkshire